Zhang Shoulie (張 壽烈, born ) is a Chinese male former weightlifter, who competed in the 52 kg category and represented China at international competitions. He won the bronze medal in the clean & jerk at the 1991 World Weightlifting Championships lifting 142.5 kg. He participated at the 1988 Summer Olympics in the 52 kg event.

References

External links
 

1966 births
Living people
Chinese male weightlifters
World Weightlifting Championships medalists
Place of birth missing (living people)
Olympic weightlifters of China
Weightlifters at the 1988 Summer Olympics
Weightlifters at the 1990 Asian Games
Asian Games medalists in weightlifting
Asian Games silver medalists for China
Medalists at the 1990 Asian Games
20th-century Chinese people